Mubarak Al-Zwair (1927 – 4 June 2022) was a Kuwaiti politician. An independent, he served in the National Assembly from 1985 to 1986.

He died on 4 June 2022.

References

1927 births
2022 deaths
Kuwaiti politicians
Members of the National Assembly (Kuwait)
People from Kuwait City